Shades of Grey is an album by trombonist Al Grey released in 1965 on the Tangerine label as TRCS-1504.

Track listing 

All compositions by Al Grey and Roger Spotts except where noted
 "Toin Me Loose" (Al Grey) – 4:25
 "Bewitched" (Richard Rodgers, Lorenz Hart) – 3:46
 "I Know You Want Me" – 3:26
 "Put It on Mellow" 7:30
 "Dinnertime" (Roger Spotts) – 6:35
 "Dinah" (Harry Akst, Joe Young, Sam M. Lewis) – 3:49
 "A New Blues" – 4:41
 "Jilly's Honey" (Grey, Sonny Payne) – 4:30

Personnel 

Al Grey – trombone, leader
Harry "Sweets" Edison – trumpet
William Hughes, Grover Mitchell (tracks 2 & 3) – trombone
Elvira Redd (tracks 4 & 6) – alto saxophone
Eddie "Lockjaw" Davis – tenor saxophone
Kirk Stuart – piano, organ
Wyatt Ruther – bass 
Rufus Jones (track 2–4 & 6), Sonny Payne (tracks 1, 5, 7 & 8) – drums
Roger Spotts – arranger

References

1965 albums
Al Grey albums
Tangerine Records (1962) albums